The 2020 Challenger La Manche was a professional tennis tournament played on indoor hard courts. It was the 27th edition of the tournament which was part of the 2020 ATP Challenger Tour. It took place in Cherbourg, France between 9 and 16 February 2020.

Singles main-draw entrants

Seeds

 1 Rankings are as of 3 February 2020.

Other entrants
The following players received wildcards into the singles main draw:
  Dan Added
  Kenny de Schepper
  Matteo Martineau
  Harold Mayot
  Lorenzo Musetti

The following players received entry from the qualifying draw:
  Vít Kopřiva
  Jules Marie

Champions

Singles

 Roman Safiullin def.  Roberto Marcora 6–4, 6–2.

Doubles

 Pavel Kotov /  Roman Safiullin def.  Dan Added /  Albano Olivetti 7–6(8–6), 5–7, [12–10].

References

2020 ATP Challenger Tour
2020
2020 in French tennis
February 2020 sports events in France